Tomb of Lala Rukh is a historical tomb in Hasan Abdal, Punjab, Pakistan, that is traditionally attributed to Princess Lala Rukh, daughter of the Mughal emperor Akbar.

Location
The tomb is located on the Islam Shaheed road in Hasan Abdal, Attock District, in present-day Punjab, Pakistan Pakistan. The tomb is just opposite to the Gurdwara Panja Sahib and the Hakimon ka Maqbara.

Descriptions
Descriptions of the tomb can be found in the travels of William Moorcroft, Charles von Hügel, Alexander Burnes, George Elphinstone Dalrymple and Allan Cunningham.

References

Mausoleums in Punjab, Pakistan
History of Punjab
Monuments and memorials in Punjab, Pakistan
Buildings and structures in Punjab, Pakistan
Attock District